Anton Yuryevich Smirnov (born 4 June 1982) is a Russian former competitive figure skater. He won two medals in the 2000–01 ISU Junior Grand Prix (JGP) series – gold in France and bronze in Norway – and qualified for the JGP Final in Ayr, Scotland, where he finished 7th. As a senior, he won silver at the 2003 Winter Universiade and bronze at the 2003 Skate Israel. Coaches were: Marina Kolyushok, Svetlana Derbina, Julia Kulibanova, Galina Kashina Saint Petersburg, Rafael Arutyunyan Moscow.

Competitive highlights 
JGP: Junior Grand Prix

References

External links 
 

1982 births
Russian male single skaters
Living people
Figure skaters from Saint Petersburg
Universiade medalists in figure skating
Universiade silver medalists for Russia
Medalists at the 2003 Winter Universiade